Hendriks is a Dutch patronymic surname. Notable people with the surname include:

A. L. Hendriks (1922–1992), Jamaican poet, writer, and broadcasting director
Arnoud Hendriks (born 1949), Dutch figure skater
Berend Hendriks (1918–1997), Dutch artist
Eileen Hendriks (1887–1978), British geologist
Geoff Hendriks (born 1959), Australian rules footballer
Irene Hendriks (born 1958), Dutch field hockey player
Jackie Hendriks (born 1933), Jamaican cricketer
Jake Hendriks (born 1981), English television actor
Jan Hendriks (1928–1991), German actor
Jean Hendriks (1925–2015), Dutch politician
Jerry Hendriks (born 1988), Dutch darts player
Jimmy Hendriks (born 1994), Dutch darts player
Joan Hendriks (born 1936), Australian indigenous rights activist
Johannes Willibrordus Maria Hendriks (born 1954), Dutch auxiliary bishop
Kaj Hendriks (born 1987), Dutch rower
Leo Hendriks (born 1983), Dutch darts player
Liam Hendriks (born 1989), Australian baseball player
Maurits Hendriks (born 1961), Dutch field hockey coach
Pieter Hendriks (born 1970), South African rugby union player
Sam Hendriks (born 1995), Dutch football player
Theo Hendriks (1928–2015), Dutch politician
Thijs Hendriks (born 1985), Dutch football player

See also 

 Jimi Hendrix
 Hendric
 Hendrick (disambiguation)
 Hendricks (disambiguation)
 Hendrickx
 Hendrik (disambiguation)
 Hendrikse
 Hendriksen
 Hendrikx
 Hendrix (disambiguation)
 Hendryx
 Henrik
 Henry (disambiguation)
 Henryk (given name)

Dutch-language surnames
Patronymic surnames
Surnames from given names